Loreto College Marryatville is an independent Roman Catholic primary and secondary day and boarding school for girls, located in Marryatville, an inner-eastern suburb of Adelaide located about  from the Adelaide city centre, in South Australia, Australia.

Established in 1905, the school is one of many around the world directed by the Institute of the Blessed Virgin Mary (IBVM). It caters for some 1,000 students from Reception to Year 12, including 70 boarders.

History
A modest house in Sydenham Road, Norwood, became the first Loreto Convent in Adelaide in 1905. The college opened with five students. Two years later the nuns bought a larger house on the corner of Eastry Street and The Parade, Norwood.

By 1920 it was obvious that a larger establishment was needed to provide for the increasing number of pupils. The junior school was housed in the ballroom, the billiard room became the dining room, and the original dining room was converted to a chapel. Senior classes were held in two rooms on the ground floor, and boarders slept on the first floor. The nuns occupied the former servants' quarters.

By 1925 the stables were converted into junior school classrooms, and the former ballroom became the chapel in 1946, with the former chapel becoming a dining room for the boarders in 1947. A new wing was opened 27 May 1951 with classrooms downstairs and dormitories for the boarders upstairs. In 1959 a science lab & classrooms were added.

College growth
The Junior School was built in 1961, and the Mary Ward wing of the Senior School in 1969. The increasing number of students necessitated new buildings and facilities, hence the Gymnasium and Art facilities were constructed in 1998, which was the same year that was designated to be the last year that the primary school years being reception new one and need to work all educational and the last year that any boys were present at the college at all. Up until 1998, in the Eastern District there were two all-boys college is being St.Ignatius & Rostrevor in the same approximate time period had started excepting boys and enrolments from reception rather than the third year, thus facilitating the relief of the burden of Loreto college of having to fill in all the holes that for the major part St.Ignatius up until that point of time had left completely unaddressed + unaccounted for. Best Junior School Administration in the state Award winning was Loreto College in 2000, was quickly followed by the award winning "Stage 3" project, which included the building of new Senior School classrooms, and the refurbishment of existing buildings, which was completed during 2001.

In 2005, four new Middle school classrooms were built in the Junior School to house Year 7 students and Chinese language classes. In conjunction with Montessori, the Loreto Bapthorpe Early Learning Centre (co-educational) was added in the latter half of 2005, and was operational from the beginning of 2006. Out of School Hours care, the new Portrush Road wall, car parking and landscaping were also developed in 2005.

A Hospitality and Food Technology Centre was opened in 2006 to deliver and expand curriculum offerings in that area. In 2007 a new Boarding Precinct Development and the St Gertrude's Music Centre were opened, and in 2010 the St Anne's Performing Arts Centre was opened.

Houses 
Similarly to the other Loreto schools throughout Australia, Loreto Marryatville has four houses. Students are allocated to different houses which they represent at the school's annual events including the Swimming Carnival, Athletics Carnival, and Performing Arts Festival.
 Ward House is named after the founder of the IBVM Sisters, Mary Ward. The House is represented by the colour blue.
 Barry House is named after Mary Gonzaga Barry who led the first group of Loreto Sisters to Australia from Ireland. The house is represented by the colour yellow. The school's art centre is also named after Mother Gonzaga Barry.
 Mulhall House is named after Mother Stanislaus Mulhall who joined Mother Gonzaga Barry as a Loreto Sister. The house is represented by the colour green.
 McGrath House is named after Mother Emilian McGrath who was the Superior of the Loreto Convent in Marryatville in the 1920s. The house is represented by the colour red.

Notable alumni 

Jessica Adamson - Channel 7 News Adelaide reporter
Emily Beaton – Adelaide Thunderbirds' mid-court netball player
Libby Kosmala – winner of nine Paralympics gold medals for shooting

Notable staff
Chloë Fox – English, French and History

See also

 List of schools in South Australia
 List of boarding schools in Australia
 Catholic education in Australia

References

External links
Loreto College website

Girls' schools in South Australia
Catholic boarding schools in Australia
Educational institutions established in 1905
Junior School Heads Association of Australia Member Schools
Boarding schools in South Australia
1905 establishments in Australia
Catholic secondary schools in Adelaide
Catholic primary schools in Adelaide
Alliance of Girls' Schools Australasia